Nesticella mogera is a spider from the family Nesticidae. It is the type species of the genus Nesticella.

Distribution
Discovered in Japan, it is found in Hawaii, Fiji, Azerbaijan, China, Korea and in 2009 in German greenhouses.

Name
The name is derived from  the Japanese word for mole.   N. mogera has been found in Japan in burrows of moles ( 1970).

Notes

References
  (2009) "First records of Spermophora kerinci, Nesticella mogera and Pseudanapis aloha on the European Mainland (Araneae: Pholcidae, Nesticidae, Anapidae)"  Arachnol. Mitt. 37: 31-34. PDF
  (2009): The world spider catalog, version 10.5. American Museum of Natural History, New York.

Nesticidae
Spiders of Asia
Spiders of Hawaii
Spiders described in 1972